Ghali or Al-Ghali may refer to:

People
Mononym
 Ghali (rapper), Italian rapper of Tunisian origin

Surname
 Boutros Ghali, Egyptian politician
 Fathia Ghali, Egyptian princess
 Mohammad Mahmoud Ghali, Egyptian scholar
 Salah Ali Al-Ghali, Sudanese politician
 Samia Ghali, French politician

Religion 

 A person belonging to the ghulat (a plural noun derived from Arabic ghali), minority Shia Muslim groups who ascribe divine characteristics to members of Muhammad's family.

Others 

 Ghali (ship), several type of ships from Nusantara region

See also
 Ghaly (disambiguation)

Arabic-language surnames